is a JR Kyushu railway station located in Miyazaki, Miyazaki Prefecture, Japan.
The central station of the prefectural capital is served by the Nippō Main Line connecting Fukuoka Prefecture and Kagoshima Prefecture. The station opened on December 15, 1913.

Lines
 Nippō Main Line

Limited Express Trains
 Nichirin (Hakata - Miyazaki)
 Kirishima (Miyazaki - Kagoshima-Chūō)

Layout

There are two side platforms and four island platforms.

Passenger statistics
In fiscal 2016, the station was used by an average of 4,773 passengers daily (boarding passengers only), and it ranked 44th among the busiest stations of JR Kyushu.

References

External links

JR Kyūshū station information 

Railway stations in Japan opened in 1913
Railway stations in Miyazaki Prefecture
Stations of Kyushu Railway Company
Miyazaki (city)